Diarsia ochracea is a moth of the family Noctuidae. It is found in Sri Lanka. It is found where tea is cultivated.

Description
Its wingspan is about 41 mm. It is an ochreous-greyish-brown or reddish-brown moth. Palpi dark at sides. Forewings with double subbasal and antemedial waved lines. The orbicular and reniform stigmata large in some specimen with a black spot between them and a triangular black spot before orbicular, the reniform often filled in chestnut colour. There is a diffused angled medial fuscous band. A double lunulate curved postmedial line present. A submarginal pale line and marginal crenulate dark line can be seen. Hindwings are fuscous brown or reddish brown.

References

Diarsia
Moths described in 1865